McKenzie is an unincorporated community in Allegany County, Maryland, United States, containing only a few houses, and mostly land. Its name is derived from a family which owned a large farm along the river bottom in the area. It is located directly across from the Allegany Ballistics Laboratory in Rocket Center, West Virginia. The area was formerly a railroad junction of the Patterson Creek Cutoff and the main B&O line. McKenzie is also the site of one of the first settlements in Allegany County, where many pieces of glass, metal, stone, and some coins have been found. In the fields of the river bottom, arrowheads and flint can be found, suggesting a possible Native American community at one time, similar to the Barton, Maryland site.

Unincorporated communities in Allegany County, Maryland
Unincorporated communities in Maryland
Populated places in the Cumberland, MD-WV MSA
Cumberland, MD-WV MSA